The Maxwell Wildlife Refuge in McPherson County, Kansas consists of  of mostly mixed grass prairie.  Bison and elk inhabit the refuge.  The McPherson State Fishing Lake adjoins the refuge and adds another  of protected area, including a  lake.

History
In 1859 an immigrant from Scotland, John Gault Maxwell (born 1825), settled in McPherson County. He helped to preserve the prairie and a remnant of the bison rapidly being extirpated from the Great Plains.  In 1940, his son Henry willed $75,000 for the establishment of a refuge. In 1951, the Maxwell Wildlife Refuge was officially opened with a herd of 10 bison and 6 elk.  A portion of the land was set aside for the construction of the McPherson County Fishing Lake.

Description
The land is rolling, with wooded areas in creek bottoms. Most of the vegetation is mixed grass prairie, intermediate between the tall grass prairie further east and the short grass prairie or steppe further west.. Mixed grass prairie in Kansas is associated with areas receiving  to  annual precipitation.

Wildlife and recreation
A herd of 150 bison and 75 elk roam the refuge.  An observation tower facilitates wildlife watching. Tram rides through the refuge are conducted by the Friends of Maxwell.  A road, often obstructed by bison herds, winds through the open range of the refuge.

A campground and public use area are located at McPherson State Fishing Lake. Signs of the presence of beavers and sightings of white-tailed deer are common.

References

Protected areas of McPherson County, Kansas
Nature reserves in Kansas